Ribeaucourt is a commune in the Somme department in Hauts-de-France in northern France.

Geography

Population

History
The name of the commune is a corruption of Erembauldocurtis (which comes from  "Eremboldus" = (skilful or bold leader) and "curtis", meaning a fortified house). Eremboldus was the name of several male members of the Ribeaucourt family, vassals to the abbey of Saint Riquier. The other communes in France bearing the same name have the same origins. During the Second World War, Ribeaucourt forest was the site of launching ramps for the German V1 missiles. The Germans also occupied the château. Allied bombardments on the 5 and 7 July 1944 caused serious damage to the village and the forest.

Places of interest
 The 17th/18th-century château and park. Classed as a historic monument.
 The church of Saint-Sulpice. Classed as a historic monument in 1993.
 The war memorial.

See also
Communes of the Somme department

References

Communes of Somme (department)